Michael C. Aish (born 21 February 1961) is a former Australian rules footballer who played for the Norwood Football Club in the South Australian National Football League (SANFL).

Career
Aish and long time Norwood teammate Garry McIntosh continually resisted many big-money offers to move to Melbourne to play in the Victorian Football League (VFL) and remained loyal to Norwood and South Australian football. This was helped also by the SANFL's controversial player retention scheme where the league paid to keep as many South Australian players in the local league as possible rather than see them cross the border to play for VFL clubs.

Aish was the second son of former Norwood captain and coach Peter Aish. He had two siblings; his older brother Andrew also played league football for Norwood, and his younger sister Susan represented South Australia in both netball and softball. He won the SANFL's highest individual honor, the Magarey Medal in 1981 at the age of just 20 and was a premiership player with Norwood in 1982 when they defeated Glenelg in the Grand Final and again in 1984 when the Redlegs defeated Port Adelaide to become the first team in SANFL history to win the premiership after finishing the minor round in 5th place. His son Jesse has also played senior football for Norwood.

From 1987 to 1989, he was club captain and won Norwood's best and fairest in 1981, 1983, 1984 and 1992, emulating his father Peter who won the club's best and fairest award in 1960. Aish represented South Australia 15 times at interstate football, captaining the side in 1986 and 1989 as well as earning All-Australian selection in 1983 and 1986.

Awards and achievements
Michael Aish retired after Norwood's Grand Final loss to Woodville-West Torrens in 1993. When the Norwood 'Team of the Century' was chosen, Aish was named as ruck-rover.

Aish was one of 113 inaugural inductees into the South Australian Football Hall of Fame in 2002.

On 24 October 2000, Aish was awarded the Australian Sports Medal for being a "recipient of the highest individual honour in South Australian Football".

References

Bibliography

External links

Living people
Magarey Medal winners
Norwood Football Club players
South Australian State of Origin players
All-Australians (1953–1988)
Australian rules footballers from South Australia
Recipients of the Australian Sports Medal
South Australian Football Hall of Fame inductees
1961 births
Australia international rules football team players